Christopher Dale Jones (born July 13, 1957) is a former backup outfielder in Major League Baseball who played for the Houston Astros and San Francisco Giants. He batted and threw left-handed.  He was signed out of San Diego State by Scout Bob Cluck. 

In a two-season career, Jones was a .192 hitter (5-for-26) with one RBI and no home runs in 34 games played.

External links
, or Retrosheet, or Pura Pelota (Venezuelan Winter League)

1957 births
Living people
Baseball players from Los Angeles
Columbus Astros players
Daytona Beach Astros players
Grossmont Griffins baseball players
Gulf Coast Astros players
Houston Astros players
Major League Baseball outfielders
Navegantes del Magallanes players
American expatriate baseball players in Venezuela
Phoenix Firebirds players
San Diego State Aztecs baseball players
San Francisco Giants players
Tucson Toros players